Unbroken Praise: At Abbey Road Studios is the ninth studio album and twelfth album overall from Matt Redman. sixsteps Records released the album on 15 June 2015.

Critical reception

Matt Conner, giving the album four stars by CCM Magazine, describes, "While the totality of it lacks any specific theme or direction, it is a solid set of eleven vertical songs that stand on their own." Awarding the album four and a half stars from New Release Today, Kevin Davis states, "These are very passionate worship songs." DeWayne Hamby, reviewing the album for Charisma, writes, "Unbroken Praise...brings 11 new sing-able tracks ready to be used for corporate and personal worship...The worship experience captured there features the singer-songwriter at his best, offering an engaging musical production that merges high-energy worship and heartfelt, memorable praise."

Jonathan Harris, rating the album a ten out of ten for Cross Rhythms, writes, "a superb album." Indicating in a four star review at Worship Leader, Jeremy Armstrong states, "Redman's Skill as a prayer-poet is clearly evident in Unbroken Praise—depending on the spiritual/emotional state of your community, you will find songs that will resonate." Giving the album a 4.2 out of five at Christian Music Review, Laura Chambers says, "Unbroken Praise transports us to a moment in time where God stirred the atmosphere and inspired hearts to glorify Him. Jono Davies, awarding the album five stars by Louder Than the Music, describes, "This isn't just another Matt Redman album, this album has songs that hit your heart with such strength that you will not be the same after you hear them. God does something amazing in these songs."

Awards and accolades
This album was No. 8, on the Worship Leader'''s Top 20 Albums of 2015 list.

The song, "Unbroken Praise", was No. 4, on the Worship Leader'''s Top 20 Songs of 2015 list.

Track listing

Chart performance

References

2015 albums
Matt Redman albums